Mohammad-Hassan Shamshiri, more known as Haj Hasan Shamshiri, was an Iranian bazaari restaurateur, philanthropist and civic patriotic activist.

Shamshiri was among leading members of the Chelow kabab guild and a patron of the National Front and its affiliated parties.

He purchased a substantional amount of the bonds issued by Governments of Mohammad Mosaddegh to support his cause. After the 1953 Iranian coup d'état, he continued his financial contributions and grassroots supports to the nationalist 'National Resistance Movement (NRM)', and was subsequently banished to an island in the Persian Gulf by the post-coup government.

References

People from Tehran
1897 births
1961 deaths
National Front (Iran) people
Iranian restaurateurs
Iranian philanthropists
Iranian activists
Iranian trade unionists
20th-century philanthropists